Moses Moses Tuiali'i (born 25 March 1981) is a former New Zealand rugby union player. A Loose forward, Tuiali'i notably played for the Crusaders in Super Rugby between 2004 and 2008. He also played for the Blues in 2003 and later the Highlanders in 2013. In between these years he moved to Japan and signed for Japanese club Yamaha Jubilo.

At a provincial level he has represented Northland, Auckland and Canterbury respectively.

Tuiali'i was first selected for the All Blacks in 2004 and played in 9 test matches until 2006.

References

External links
Crusaders profile

1981 births
New Zealand sportspeople of Samoan descent
Rugby union players from Auckland
New Zealand international rugby union players
Northland rugby union players
Auckland rugby union players
Canterbury rugby union players
Crusaders (rugby union) players
Highlanders (rugby union) players
Living people
New Zealand rugby union players
New Zealand expatriate rugby union players
Expatriate rugby union players in Japan
New Zealand expatriate sportspeople in Japan
Blues (Super Rugby) players
Shizuoka Blue Revs players
People educated at Kelston Boys' High School
Rugby union number eights